The 2010 Italian local elections were held on different dates; most on 29–30 March (second round on 11–12 April) concurrently with the Regional elections.

In Trentino-Alto Adige/Südtirol the elections were held on 15–16 May with a second ballot on 30–31 May; all of 321 comuni of the region voted for a new mayor and a new City Council.

In Aosta Valley the elections were held on 23–24 May in the city of Aosta.

On May 30–31 the elections were held in Sicily and Sardinia.

In Italy, direct elections were held in municipalities and provinces: in each municipality (comune) were chosen mayor and members of the City Council, in each province were chosen president and members of the Provincial Council.

Citizens living in Italy who were 18 or over on election day were entitled to vote in the local council elections.

Voting system
The voting system is used for all mayoral elections in Italy in cities with a population higher than 15,000. Under this system voters express a direct choice for the mayor or an indirect choice voting for the party of the candidate's coalition. If no candidate receives at least 50% of votes, the top two candidates go to a second round after two weeks. This gives a result whereby the winning candidate may be able to claim majority support, although it is not guaranteed.

The election of the City Council is based on a direct choice for the candidate with a preference vote: the candidate with the majority of the preferences is elected. The number of the seats for each party is determined proportionally.

Municipal elections

Mayoral election results

City councils

Provincial elections
Only 12 provinces were up for election. The elections was for a new provincial president and members of the Provincial Council.
Four presidents were elected in March. Then on May was elected all the provincial president and Provincial Council of Sardinia.

President election results

See also 
 2010 Sardinian provincial elections

Notes

2010 elections in Italy
 
 
Municipal elections in Italy
Provincial elections in Italy
March 2010 events in Italy
April 2010 events in Italy
May 2010 events in Italy
June 2010 events in Italy